Hell in Normandy (Italian title: Testa di sbarco per otto implacabili, French title: Tête de pont pour huit implacables) is a 1968 French/Italian international co-production Euro War film set during World War II and directed by Alfonso Brescia.

Plot
Prior to the invasion of France, Allied Intelligence launches Operation GAMBIT, the destruction of a bunker containing the controls to a device to flood the waters off the American landing at Omaha Beach with oil and ignite it to destroy the landing craft.

The first phase is a preliminary reconnaissance by a contingent of the French Resistance led by a woman codenamed Denise (Erika Blanc).  The second phase is infiltration of the bunker by a team of three Allied commandoes impersonating two German officers that includes the inventor of the process and their driver who have been scheduled to visit the installation that have been intercepted and assassinated by the Resistance. The team, led by Lt. Strobel (Peter Lee Lawrence) is to locate the mechanism for the process and relay that information to England. Phase three is an American parachute attack on the installation on the night prior to D-Day led by Captain Murphy (Guy Madison).

Leading his strike force in rehearsals for the raid, Captain Murphy is growing more disillusioned about the scheme due to what he feels is Allied Intelligence giving the surprise away due to the continued reconnaissance.  Murphy also feels the code name "gambit", a chess term for the sacrifice of a pawn, is meant to apply to his command.

Phase two is initially successful until the bodies of the Germans the Allied infiltrators are impersonating are discovered by German detector dogs.  Only Lt. Strobel is able to escape to the safety of Denise and her father, an old man tired and frightened of war.

Captain Murphy's strike force flies to France on the night of June 4, with the first of the invasion force but after Murphy and nine of his men parachute into France the mission is suddenly aborted due to bad weather; the rest of Murphy's unit returns to England leaving Murphy and his men on their own.

Denise, Strobel and Murphy and his small group pool their resources at Denise's father's farm for what they feel is a suicide mission.

Cast
Guy Madison: Captain Jack Murphy 
Peter Lee Lawrence: Lt. Strobel 
Erika Blanc: Denise 
Philippe Hersent: Professor Aubernet 
Massimo Carocci: Captain Ryan 
George F. Salvage  (as G.F. Savage) 
Pierre Richard: Sergeant Doss 
Antonio Monselesan  (as Tony Norton) 
Max Turilli: Feldwebel Siedler 
Giuseppe Castellano  (as G. Castellano) 
Renato Pinciroli: Denise's father (as R. Pinciroli) 
Luciano Lorcas 
Paolo Magalotti
Guido Di Salvo
Gianni Pulone
Giovanni Ivan Scratuglia: Navy officer (as Ivan Scratuglia) 
Giuseppe Terranova   
Sergio Testori
R. Mantovani
John Bartha: Ted Bancroft - American General (uncredited) 
William Conroy: German Soldier (uncredited) 
Tom Felleghy: Colonel Voller (uncredited) 
Renato Pugluai: (uncredited) 
Michele Titov: (uncredited) 
Bill Vanders: David - American Officer (uncredited)

References

External links

1968 films
Macaroni Combat films
Operation Overlord films
French World War II films
1960s French films
1960s Italian films
World War II films based on actual events
Films set in bunkers